Lilley may refer to:

Surname
 Charles Lilley (1827–1897), chief justice in Queensland
 Chris Lilley (comedian) (born 1974), Australian comedian
 Chris Lilley (computer scientist) (born 1959), British computer scientist
 David Lilley (born 1977), Scottish footballer
 Dick Lilley (1866–1929), English cricketer
 George L. Lilley (1859–1909), U.S. Congressman and Governor
 James R. Lilley (1928–2009), U.S. diplomat
 Jemma Lilley (born 1991), English crime fiction writer and murderer
 Jen Lilley (born 1984), American actress and singer
 Jordan Lilley (born 1996), English rugby league footballer
 Madison Lilley (born 1999), American volleyball player
 Mial Eben Lilley (1850–1915), U.S. Congressman
 Peter Lilley (born 1943), British politician
 Valerie Lilley (born 1939), Northern Irish actress

Places
 Division of Lilley, an electoral division in Queensland, Australia
 Lilley, Berkshire, a location in the U.K.
 Lilley, Hertfordshire, England
 Lilley Township, Michigan, USA

See also
 Lili (disambiguation)
 Lille (disambiguation)
 Lilli (disambiguation)
 Lillie (disambiguation)
 Lilly (disambiguation)
 Lily (disambiguation)
 

English-language surnames